The 2020–21 season of AS Douanes was the 1st season for the club in the Basketball Africa League. The team began the season on 17 May 2021, in its season opener against Algeria's GS Pétroliers.

The Douanes entered the season directly as champions of the Nationale 1 and were placed in Group B. The team advanced past the group phase as a lucky loser and qualified for the 2021 BAL Playoffs as seventh-seed. In the quarterfinals, later to be finalist US Monastir easily eliminated Douanes.

The most remarkable players of the team were Mamadou Faye and Bara Diop, who made their debut at the international stage and would later be called up for the Senegal national basketball team.

Roster

Team

Additions

|}

BAL

Group phase

|- style="background:#cfc;"
| 1
| 17 May
| GS Pétroliers
| W 94–76
| Bara Diop (17)
| Bara Diop (9)
| Mamadou Faye (7)
| Kigali Arena607
| 1–0
|- style="background:#fcc;"
| 2
| 18 May
| Ferroviário de Maputo
| L 88–74
| Mamadou Faye (15)
| Bamba Diallo (7)
| Mamadou Faye (5)
| Kigali Arena508
| 1–1
|- style="background:#fcc;"
| 3
| 19 May
| Zamalek
| L 62–82
| Bara Diop (14)
| Bara Diop (9)
| Alkaly Ndour (4)
| Kigali ArenaN/A
| 1–2

Playoffs

|- style="background:#fcc;"
| Quarter-finals
| 27 May
| US Monastir
| L 86–62
| Bamba Diallo (15)
| Bara Diop (5)
| Mamadou Faye (5)
| Kigali Arena643
| N/A

Statistics

Source:

References

2021 BAL season